Bezena is a settlement on the right bank of the Drava River in the Municipality of Ruše in northeastern Slovenia. The area is part of the traditional region of Styria. The municipality is now included in the Drava Statistical Region.

The village chapel-shrine dates to the late 18th century.

References

External links
Bezena at Geopedia

Populated places in the Municipality of Ruše